Shaun Gore (born 21 September 1968) is an English former professional footballer and coach.

After injury ended a promising playing career with Fulham, he became Chelsea FC's Football in the Community director in 1992. In 2005, he sacked Chelsea Ladies' manager George Michaelas and ran the team himself until being replaced by Steve Jones in 2008.

References 

1968 births
Living people
Footballers from West Ham
English footballers
English football managers
Fulham F.C. players
Halifax Town A.F.C. players
Wealdstone F.C. players
Fisher Athletic F.C. players
Billericay Town F.C. players
Chelsea F.C. Women managers
Association football defenders